Holy Family Hospital Nyapea, commonly referred to as Nyapea Hospital, is a faith-based community hospital in Nyapea, Zombo District,  in the Northern Region of Uganda. It is a private, non-profit, hospital, serving the town of Nyapea and surrounding areas of West Nile sub-region.

Location
The hospital is located in the town of Nyapea, off of the Pakwach–Arua Road.

The geographical coordinates of Nyapea Hospital are: 02°27'44.0"N, 30°57'02.0"E (Latitude:02.462222; Longitude:30.950556).

Overview
Nyapea Hospital is a rural faith-based, non-profit community hospital, affiliated with the Uganda Catholic Medical Bureau. Established in 1985, the hospital has a bed capacity of 137. Holy Family Hospital Nyapea averaged 16,106 outpatient visits annually, as of December 2019. At that time, the hospital averaged 5,662 inpatient admissions, annually, with a bed occupancy ratio of 34.8 percent. An average of 1,194 maternal deliveries were attended to annually, with a caesarian section rate of 47.6 percent. This high rate of caesarian births is attributed to the short stature of the mothers and the associated narrow pelvises that they have.

Patient user-fees amount to approximately 22.5 percent of total hospital annual income, on average. The hospital faces two major challenges; one being unreliable electricity supply and the other being lack of adequate potable water supply.

See also
List of hospitals in Uganda

References

External links
 Drug stock outs a thing of the past for Holy Family Hospital Nyapea As of 5 August 2019.

Hospitals in Uganda
Zombo District
West Nile sub-region
Northern Region, Uganda
Catholic hospitals in Africa
Hospitals established in 1985
1985 establishments in Uganda